Kundan Lal (1893 – 1966) was an Indian businessman, freedom fighter, philanthropist and founder of Kundan Vidya Mandir, one of the first girls' schools in Ludhiana.

Early life
Kundan Lal was born in the year 1893 in Ludhiana, Punjab, to a Patwari father. He completed his BSc degree from Government College, Punjab University, Lahore, in pre-partition India. He was directly admitted to the Provincial Civil Service in 1915 and appointed as a Sub Divisional Magistrate in Nagpur. In 1920, he met Jawaharlal Nehru during the non-cooperation movement was launched by the Congress Party.

Freedom Fighter
In 1926 Kundan Lal joined the Congress Party to support  Indian independence and hosted the landmark  All India States People Conference Ludhiana, in February 1939, better known as the “Ludhiana Session”.

Philanthropy
With India’s independence in 1947, Kundan Lal turned his attention to educating a generation of Indians. He started a charitable trust, Shri Kundanlal Trust, and donated most of his assets to it. He started Kundan Vidya Mandir in 1941, initially as a girls-only school, and converted to a co-educational school around 1958.

Humanitarian
On a trip to Vienna, Austria, for a medical procedure in 1938 he saw the plight of Jews under Hitler’s tyranny and helped rescue 14 Jews out of Austria.

References

Indian rebels
1893 births
1966 deaths